There are several lists of tennis players:

Men
 List of male singles tennis players
 List of male doubles tennis players
 Rankings
 List of ATP number 1 ranked singles tennis players
 List of ATP number 1 ranked doubles tennis players
 World number 1 ranked male tennis players
 Top ten ranked male tennis players
 Top ten ranked male tennis players (1912–1972)
 Women
 List of female tennis players
 Rankings
 List of WTA number 1 ranked singles tennis players
 List of WTA number 1 ranked doubles tennis players
 World number 1 ranked female tennis players
 Top ten ranked female tennis players
 Top ten ranked female tennis players (1921–1974)

Tournament winners
 List of Australian Open champions
 List of French Open champions
 List of Wimbledon champions
 List of US Open champions
 List of Olympic tennis medalists

Professional tours
 Tennis players with most titles in the Open Era